Zhao Youfeng (born May 5, 1965) is a former long-distance runner from PR China. She represented her native country at the 1988 Summer Olympics in Seoul, South Korea, finishing in 5th place. She set her personal best in the same year, clocking 2:27:06.

Achievements
All results regarding marathon, unless stated otherwise

External links
 

1965 births
Living people
Chinese female long-distance runners
Athletes (track and field) at the 1988 Summer Olympics
Olympic athletes of China
Asian Games medalists in athletics (track and field)
Runners from Jiangsu
Athletes (track and field) at the 1990 Asian Games
Asian Games gold medalists for China
Medalists at the 1990 Asian Games